The Peșteana is a right tributary of the river Tismana in Romania. It flows into the Tismana near Ciuperceni.

References

Rivers of Romania
Rivers of Gorj County